The Quezon Service Cross is the highest national recognition of the Republic of the Philippines. It has been awarded to only a handful of Filipinos since its creation in 1946.

Background

The award was created by Joint Resolution No. 4 dated October 21, 1946 of the 1st Congress of the Philippines. A joint resolution of the Congress of the Philippines has the force of law. The Quezon Service Cross is a  conferred by the President of the Philippines with the concurrence of the Congress of the Philippines on Filipino citizens for "exemplary service to the nation in such a manner and such a degree as to add great prestige to the Republic of the Philippines, or as to contribute to the lasting benefit of its people".

Nominations for the Quezon Service Cross need to state the services meriting the award and are made only in cases where the service performed or contribution made can be measured on the scale established by what the joint resolution terms "the benefaction" of the late President Manuel L. Quezon, after whom the decoration is named.

The Quezon Service Cross was proposed by President Manuel Roxas. It is also referred to as the Congressional Quezon Service Cross, as conferment requires the approval of the Congress of the Philippines and is seldom awarded.

Awardees

Only seven Filipinos have been conferred this decoration:

See also
 Orders, decorations, and medals of the Philippines

References

External links
 Official Gazette: Executive Order No. 236, s. 2003
 Quezon.ph - Quezon Service Cross

Orders, decorations, and medals of the Philippines
Manuel L. Quezon